Ferdinand Victor Henri Lot (Le Plessis Piquet, 20 September 1866 – Fontenay-aux-Roses, 20 July 1952) was a French historian and medievalist. His masterpiece, The End of the Ancient World and the Beginnings of the Middle Ages (1927), presents an alternative account of the fall of the Roman Empire than does Edward Gibbon's Decline and Fall of the Roman Empire, which had set the tone for Enlightenment scholarship in blaming the fall of classical civilization on Christianity.

Lot was a member of the Académie des Inscriptions et Belles-Lettres, part of the Institut de France, and an honorary professor at the Sorbonne.

Select bibliography
   [https://archive.org/details/in.ernet.dli.2015.24768/page/n7/mode/2up The End of the Ancient World and the Beginning of the Middle Ages. London: Kegan Paul, 1931. (La Fin du monde antique et le début du Moyen Age.)]
 La France, des origines à la guerre de cent ans. (Paris: Gallimard, 1941).
 L'Art Militaire et les Armees au Moyen Age (Paris, 1946)
 La Gaule, Les fondements ethniques, sociaux et politiques de la nation française. (Paris: Fayard, 1947).

Further reading
 Mahn-Lot, Marianne, "À propos des papiers inédits de Ferdinand Lot" in Bibliothèque de l'école des Chartes, Volume  155, Number 1, 1977.   (Available online at Persée) 
 Perrin, Charles Edmond, "Ferdinand Lot, 1866–1952" in Hautes études médiévales et modernes, no. 4, 1968.  
 

References

External links
  Works by Ferdinand Lot at Les classiques des sciences sociales'' (UQAC)

Members of the Académie des Inscriptions et Belles-Lettres
1866 births
1952 deaths
Arthurian scholars
French medievalists
20th-century French historians
French male writers
Corresponding Fellows of the Medieval Academy of America
Corresponding Fellows of the British Academy
École Nationale des Chartes alumni